The Two-woman competition at the IBSF World Championships 2023 was held on 3 and 4 February 2023.

Results
The first two runs were started on 3 February at 13:04 and the last two runs on 4 February at 09:00.

References

Two-woman